Ambodimangavalo is a town and commune in Madagascar. It belongs to the district of Vavatenina, which is a part of the Analanjirofo Region. The population of the commune was estimated to be approximately 11,000 in the 2001 census.

Only primary schooling is available. The vast majority (98%) of the commune's population are farmers.  The most important crops are coffee and cloves. Rice is also an important agricultural product. The service sector provides employment for 2% of the population.

References and notes 

Populated places in Analanjirofo